Carrington Park is a rugby league and soccer stadium in Bathurst, New South Wales, Australia

Soccer
Carrington Park hosted an A-League Regional Round clash between Adelaide United and Newcastle Jets on 25 January 2012.

Rugby league
On 8 June 2001, Carrington Park hosted its first City versus Country match. Country defeated City 42–10 in front of a crowd of 8,872.

On 26 July 2014, Carrington Park hosted an NRL game between the Penrith Panthers and the Cronulla-Sutherland Sharks, the Sharks winning 18-16. Another NRL match was played at the ground on Saturday 14 March 2015 between Penrith Panthers and Gold Coast Titans. The Panthers won 40-0.

The record NRL crowd was set on Saturday 26 March 2022 when the match between the Penrith Panthers and the Newcastle Knights attracted 11,253 spectators.

National Rugby League matches

Concerts

As a part of his Farewell Yellow Brick Road tour, English musician Elton John performed at Carrington Park on 22 January 2020 before a record crowd of 19,149.

References

External links 

Soccer venues in New South Wales
Rugby union stadiums in Australia
Rugby league stadiums in Australia
Sports venues in New South Wales